Susan Collins (born 1952) is an American politician. 

Susan or Sue Collins may also refer to:

Susan M. Collins (economist),  American scholar in economics and public policy
Susan Collins (artist) (born 1964), British artist
Sue Collins, composer, see Grammy Award for Best Score Soundtrack for Visual Media
Sue Collins (editor), see The Blood of Hussain

See also
Suzanne Collins (disambiguation)